Donald Anton Henriksen (October 10, 1929 – May 14, 2008) was a professional basketball power forward–center who spent two seasons in the National Basketball Association (NBA) as a member of the Baltimore Bullets and the Rochester Royals. He attended the University of California.

External links

1929 births
2008 deaths
Baltimore Bullets (1944–1954) players
Basketball players from Illinois
California Golden Bears men's basketball players
Centers (basketball)
Power forwards (basketball)
Rochester Royals players
Undrafted National Basketball Association players